Naguila are a France-based Algerian and Moroccan ensemble for early music. The group was founded by Pierre-Luc Ben Soussan in 1998.

Discography
Chants mystiques séfarades, cantor André Taïeb. Instrumentalist: Kamal Berrada (oud, ney); Mohamed Zeftari (violin), Pierre-Luc Ben Soussan (riqq, darabuka),  L'empreinte digitale, 1999. 
Hallel, Sephardic songs
Hayam Hagadol, 2006
Also
Chants séfarades des Synagogues du Languedoc. André Taïeb, CLRMDT/Abeille Musique, 2003.

References

Algerian musical groups
1998 establishments in France